Cerizay is a commune in the Deux-Sèvres department in the Nouvelle-Aquitaine region in western France.

History
The name Cerizay probably originated during the closing centuries of the Roman occupation.  During the Middle Ages the old town centre was situated beside a feudal castle. The last two towers of the castle, along with its 12th century chapel, were destroyed when the present (rather flamboyant) church was constructed in 1890.

Economy
The automotive coachbuilder firm Heuliez had its main production plant on the outskirts of the town.  They have been involved in the production of various niche models for French car manufacturers.  The firm currently construct the roof module for the Peugeot 206CC and till 2009 built the Vauxhall/Opel Tigra Twin Top. Between June 2011 and December 2013, the "Mia", an electric car developed in Germany, was built under contract with an annual output of 10,000 units.

People
Famous residents include:
Philippe de Mornay

Twin towns
 Chipping Ongar, England.

See also
Communes of the Deux-Sèvres department

References

Communes of Deux-Sèvres